Haggart Observatory  is an astronomical observatory found at the John Inskeep Environmental Learning Center of Clackamas Community College.  It is located in Oregon City, Oregon, United States.

See also 
List of observatories

References

External links
 Haggart Observatory Clear Sky Clock Forecasts of observing conditions.

Astronomical observatories in Oregon
Buildings and structures in Clackamas County, Oregon